The Baltic Landwehr or  ("Baltic Territorial Army") was the name of the unified armed forces of Couronian and Livonian nobility from 7 December 1918 to 3 July 1919.

Command structure 

The Landeswehr was subordinated to the German VI Reserve Corps which Generalmajor Rüdiger von der Goltz (military governor of  Libau in Latvia from 1 February 1919) commanded from 2 February 1919. Major Alfred Fletcher and Lieutenant-Colonel Harold Alexander commanded the Landeswehr during its operations.

Commanders 
 Major Emil von Scheibler (7 December 1918 - 6 February 1919)
 Major Alfred Fletcher (6 February 1919 - 3 July 1919)
 Lieutenant-Colonel Harold Alexander (British; July 1919)

History 

After the November 11, 1918, armistice the Inter-Allied Commission of Control insisted that the German troops remain in the Baltic countries to prevent the region from being re-occupied by the Red Army. As the Soviet westward offensive approached, the Provisional Government of Latvia approached August Winnig, the German attorney in the Baltics, and signed an agreement with him authorising the organisation of land defense forces on 7 December 1918. The parties signed another agreement on 29 December which secured all foreign soldiers, who participated in the battles for the freedom of Latvia, full citizenship of Latvia. The arms, horse harness and uniforms were to be supplied by the state of Germany. The food supplies were to be taken care of by the Provisional Government of Latvia.

Theaters and campaigns 
In late February 1919 only the seaport of Liepāja (Libau) and surroundings remained in the hands of the German and Latvian forces. In February and March 1919, the Landeswehr was able to win a series of victories over the Red Army, first occupying the port of Ventspils (Windau), and then advancing south and east towards Riga. The murder of three men of the Baltische Landeswehr led to the coup d'état of April 16, 1919, by the proclamation of the Government of a Lutheran clergyman, Andrievs Niedra. Parleys, in which the United States and the United Kingdom took part, did not prevent the advance on Riga and the capture of this city on May 22, where Baron Hans von Manteuffel-Szoege made an entry with a small detachment, and died leading his men. Latvian national government was deposed while the Freikorps moved on to capture Riga on May 23, 1919. Latvians sought assistance from the Estonian Army which had been occupying Northern Latvia since earlier that year. After the Bolsheviks had been driven out from most of Latvia, the Allies ordered the German government to withdraw its troops from the Baltic region. However, the Germans succeeded in negotiating a postponement, arguing that this would have given the Bolsheviks a free hand. In June 1919, General von der Goltz ordered his troops not to advance east against the Red Army, as the Allies had been expecting, but north, against the Estonians. On June 19, the Landeswehr launched an attack to capture areas around Cēsis (Wenden), however in the battles over the following few days they were defeated by the Estonian 3rd Division, including the Latvian 2nd Cesis regiment, led by Ernst Põdder. On the morning of June 23, the Germans began a general retreat toward Riga. The Allies again insisted that the Germans withdraw their remaining troops from Latvia and intervened to impose a ceasefire between the Estonians and the Landeswehr when the Estonians were about to march into Riga. In the meantime, an Allied mission composed of British troops under General Sir Hubert de la Poer Gough had arrived in the Baltic with the task of clearing the Germans from the region and organizing native armies for the Baltic States.

Subsequent 

The legion served under the West Russian Volunteer Army commanded by Colonel Prince Pavel Bermondt-Avalov in his attempt to capture Riga, but suffered complete defeat by the end of November 1919.

The British insisted that General von der Goltz leave Latvia, and he turned his troops over to Bermondt-Avalov's West Russian Volunteer Army. General von der Goltz later claimed in his memoirs that his major strategic goal in 1919 had been to launch a campaign in cooperation with the white Russian forces to overturn the Bolshevik regime by marching on Saint Petersburg and to install a pro-German government in Russia.

The purged Baltische Landeswehr units subsequently assisted in the liberation of Latgale from Bolsheviks together with Latvian and Polish armies in January 1920.

Prominent members 

Prominent Baltic officers from the Landeswehr era include:

 Generalmajor Erich Alt (Luftwaffe) (leader of the 1. Baltischen Flieger-Abteilung (433))
 Generalmajor Rudolf Bader (in the Badisches Freiwilligen Abteilung Medem)
 Generalmajor Heinrich Baron von Behr
 Generalmajor z.V. Heinrich Burggraf und Graf zu Dohna-Schlobitten
 Generalmajor Karl Dormagen
 Generalmajor Dipl. Ing. Hans Henrici
 General der Artillerie Kurt Jahn
 Generalleutnant Heinrich Rauch (Luftwaffe) (aerial observer in Flieger-Abteilung 433)
 Oberst (Colonel) Wessel Freytag von Loringhoven

(the ranks are the highest ranks reached in the Third Reich era)

Rank insignia 
Members of the Baltische Landeswehr wore shoulder strap piping in light blue and white, the Baltic colors.

Commissioned officers

Enlisted personnel

Order of battle (20 May 1919) 
1. Deutsch-Balt. Kampfbataillon (Stoßtrupp Manteuffel; Baron Hans von Manteuffel)
2. Deutsch-Balt. Kampfbataillon (Hauptmann Malmede)
3. Deutsch-Balt. Kampfbataillon (Rittmeister Graf zu Eulenburg)
MG-Scharfschützen-Abteilung (Hauptmann Freiherr von Khaynach)
Russische Abteilung Fürst Lieven (Cavalry Captain Prince Anatolii Pavlovich Liven or, in German, Fürst Anatol Leonid Lieven)
Lettische Kampf-Brigade (Colonel Jānis Balodis)
Stamm-Kompanie Talssen
Stamm-Kompanie Tuckum
Balten-Kompanie des Gouvernement Libau
Elements of the MG-Kompanie of III./Freiwilligen-Regiment Libau (Gouvernement Libau)
Lettische Kavallerie-Abteilung
Russische Kavallerie-Abteilung
Kavallerie-Abteilung Engelhardt
Kavallerie-Abteilung Drachenfels
Kavallerie-Abteilung Pappenheim
Kavallerie-Abteilung Halm
1. Deutsch-Balt. Batterie (Ehmke)
2. Deutsch-Balt. Batterie (Barth)
3. Deutsch-Balt. Batterie (Sievert)
Deutsch-Balt. Haubitze-Batterie
Russische Batterie (Röhl)
Badisches Freiwilligen Abteilung Medem (attached Korpstruppe)
Lettische Pionier-Kompanie
Pionier-Abteilung Stromberg
Balt. Fernsprech-Abteilung
Lettische Fernsprech-Abteilung
Balt. Funker-Abteilung
Flieger-Abteilung 433 (attached Korpstruppe)
Armee-Kraftwagen-Kolonne 021 (attached Korpstruppe)
Staffel-Stab der Landeswehr (Major Wölki)
Munitions- und Train-Kolonne I
Munitions- und Train-Kolonne II
Landeskolonne III
Feldlazarett
Sanitäts-Kompanie
Sanitäts-Kraftwagen-Zug
Wirtschafts-Kompanie 1
Wirtschafts-Kompanie 2
Bahnschutz-Detachement
Pferdelazarett
Sammeldepot Libau

See also 
Aftermath of World War I
Bundeswehr
Estonian War of Independence
Freikorps in the Baltic
German Army (German Empire)
Latvian Riflemen
Latvian War of Independence
Ober Ost
Reichswehr
United Baltic Duchy
Wehrmacht

References

Bibliography 
 Goltz Rüdiger von der, Meine Sendung im Finland und im Baltikum, Leipzig 1920.
 Goltz Rüdiger von der, Minu missioon Soomes ja Baltikumis, Tartu, Loodus 1937; faksiimiletrükk Tallinn, Olion 2004. .
 Bermond-Awaloff Pavel, Im Kampf gegen den Bolschevismus. Erinnerungen von..., Berlin 1925.
 BischoffJosef, Die letzte Front. Geschichte der Eiserne Division im Baltikum 1919, Berlin 1935.
 Darstellungen aus den Nachkriegskämpfen deutscher Truppen und Freikorps, Bd 2: Der Feldzug im Baltikum bis zur zweiten Einnahme von Riga. Januar bis Mai 1919, Berlin 1937; Bd 3: Die Kämpfe im Baltikum nach der zweiten Einnahme von Riga. Juni bis Dezember 1919, Berlin 1938.
 Die Baltische Landeswehr im Befreiungskampf gegen den Bolschewismus, Riga 1929.
 Eesti Vabadussõda 1918-1920, Tallinn, Mats, 1997. .
 Kiewisz Leon, Sprawy łotewskie w bałtyckiej polityce Niemiec 1914-1919, Poznań 1970.
 Łossowski Piotr, Między wojną a pokojem. Niemieckie zamysły wojenne na wschodzie w obliczu traktatu wersalskiego. Marzec-kwiecień 1919, Warszawa 1976.
 Paluszyński Tomasz, Walka o niepodległość Łotwy 1914-1920, Warszawa 1999.
 Von den baltische Provinzen zu den baltischen Staaten. Beiträge zur Entstehungsgeschichte der Republiken Estland und Lettland, Bd I (1917-1918), Bd II (1919-1920), Marburg 1971, 1977.

External links 
 A cannon of the Landeswehr
 An airplane of the Landeswehr
 "Hans von Manteuffel" honor title
 Centek, Jaroslaw: Baltische Landwehr, in: 1914-1918-online. International Encyclopedia of the First World War.

Courland Governorate
Estonian War of Independence
Governorate of Livonia
Military history of Latvia
Military units and formations established in 1918
Organisations based in Livonia
Anti-communist organizations
Independence of Latvia